Louis de Laval (1411 – 21 August 1489) was a French nobleman, soldier, politician and bibliophile.

Life
A member of the House of Laval, Louis was born in 1411. He was the third son of the Baroness Anne de Laval and Baron Guy XIII. He inherited the lordship of Châtillon-en-Vendelais in the barony of Vitré.

When his elder brothers, Count Guy XIV de Laval and André de Lohéac, joined Joan of Arc's campaign in 1429, Louis stayed home with their mother. In 1431, he was made captain of Jugon by Duke John V of Brittany. He later served Duke Peter II and the Constable Arthur de Richemont. He was a permanent member of Richemont's company between 1443 and 1445.

Afterwards, Louis sought advancement at the royal court. King Charles VII appointed him governor of the Dauphiné in 1448 and of French-occupied Genoa in 1461. He was in Genoa when Louis XI succeeded Charles on the throne. When the War of the Public Weal broke out in 1465, he remained loyal to the crown. On 4 August 1465, he was named governor of Champagne. In a letter to the city of Reims, the king praised Louis as "a man of great conduct, wise and expert in warfare and other things."

On 18 May 1466, Louis XI appointed Louis , with the power to appoint and dismiss all officials under him. On 21 May 1483, however, the king limited his powers. Although he spent his career in royal service in various parts of France, Louis still frequently joined his elder brother for hunts on his Breton estates. Thomas Basin relates a story of how Louis attempted to put him in his debt by intervening on Thomas's behalf without being asked. Thomas calls him a "generous and powerful lord".

Louis and his brother André were among the original twelve knights of the Order of Saint Michael, created by Louis XI on 1 August 1469. In 1483, Louis was appointed governor of Touraine. He maintained a pro-French attitude throughout the Mad War of 1485–1488 and, in one of his final letters, dated 16 October 1488, urged Charles VIII to marry the Breton heiress, Anne of Brittany, thereby uniting the duchy with the crown.

Bibliophily

Nine manuscripts from Louis's library are now in the Bibliothèque nationale de France. Six of these he acquired and three he had commissioned. The six are:

MS fr. 409, a 14th-century French religious miscellany, including homilies on the Nativity and the conversion of Paul; Le mariage de Nostre-Dame; La passion de Nostre Seigneur Jhesu Crist; La vie de Magdaleine; Lamentation Notre Dame; and Laurent d'Orléans's La somme le roi
MS fr. 2652, a copy of the second book of Froissart's Chronicles
MS fr. 2653, a copy of the third book of Froissart's Chronicles
MS fr. 2654, a copy of the fourth book of Froissart's Chronicles

Louis's chaplain Sébastien Mamerot translated many texts from Latin into French for his patron. Louis commissioned from him a translation and continuation of the universal history of Martin of Opava. The resulting Cronicques martiniennes, now MS fr. 9684, was presented in 1458. Louis also commissioned him to write a history of the Crusades, which became the Passages d'outremer. The presentation copy from 1474 or 1475, now MS fr. 5594, was illustrated by Jean Colombe and possibly . It follows the use of Rome and contains three illustrations of Louis's coat of arms and three portraits. In his will, Louis left his book of hours to Anne of France, duchess of Bourbon.

Notes

Bibliography

1489 deaths
House of Laval